Earth First! is a radical environmental advocacy group that originated in the Southwestern United States. It was founded in 1980 by Dave Foreman, Mike Roselle, Howie Wolke, Bart Koehler, and Ron Kezar. Today there are Earth First! groups around the world including ones in Australia, Belgium, Canada, the Czech Republic, France, Germany, India, Ireland, Italy, Mexico, the Netherlands, Nigeria, New Zealand, the Philippines, Poland, Slovakia, Spain, the United Kingdom, and the United States.

Inspired by several environmental writings, including Rachel Carson's Silent Spring, Aldo Leopold's land ethic, and Edward Abbey's The Monkey Wrench Gang, a small group of environmental activists composed of Dave Foreman, ex-Yippie Mike Roselle, Wyoming Wilderness Society representatives Bart Koehler and Howie Wolke, and Bureau of Land Management employee Ron Kezar, united to form Earth First!. While traveling in Foreman's VW bus from the El Pinacate y Gran Desierto de Altar Biosphere Reserve in northern Mexico to Albuquerque, New Mexico, the group pledged, "No compromise in defense of Mother Earth!".

The co-founders of the group were called to action during the second "Roadless Area Review and Evaluation" (RARE II) by the U.S. Forest Service, which they considered a sell-out by mainstream environmental advocates. The activists envisioned a revolutionary movement, with the goal to set aside multi-million-acre ecological preserves all across the United States. Their ideas drew upon the concepts of conservation biology, which had been developing for over twenty years by notable scientists like E. O. Wilson; however, mainstream environmental groups were slow to embrace the new science. These events and ideologies coalesced after a grueling hike, as the men were headed toward Albuquerque. After "Foreman called out 'Earth First!', Roselle drew a clenched fist logo, passed it up to the front of the van, and there was Earth First!".

Early years, from 1980–1989 
Earth First! was founded on April 4, 1980, by Dave Foreman, Mike Roselle, Howie Wolke, Bart Koehler, and Ron Kezar.

During the group's early years (1980–1986), Earth First! mixed publicity stunts (such as rolling a plastic "crack" down Glen Canyon Dam) with far-reaching wilderness proposals that reportedly surpassed the actions that mainstream environmental groups were willing to take (relying on conservation biology research from a biocentric perspective). The group's proposals were published in a periodical, Earth First! The Radical Environmental Journal, informally known as the Earth First! Journal. Edward Abbey often spoke at early gatherings, and his inspirational writings led him to be revered by the early movement. An annual gathering of the group was known as the Round River Rendezvous, with the name taken from an Ojibwa myth about a continuous river of life flowing into and out of itself and sustaining all relations. The rendezvous is a celebration with art and music, as well as an activist conference with workshops and recounts of past actions. Another project led by the organization at this time was the creation of Earth First! Foundation, a tax-deductible fund which was established to provide financial support for research, advocacy and education by Earth First! activists. The fund was later renamed the Fund for Wild Nature in 1991.

In the spring of 1985, a nationwide call to action against the logging company Willamette Industries, published in the Earth First! Journal brought Earth First! members from around the United States to the Willamette National Forest of Western Oregon. After finding road blockades (carried out by Corvallis-based Cathedral Forest Action Group) were not an efficient form of protection against logging, Marylander Ron Huber and Washingtonian Mike Jakubal devised tree sitting as a more effective civil disobedience alternative.

On May 23, 1985, Mike Jakubal led the first Earth First! tree sit. When U.S. Forest Service law enforcement official Steve Slagowski arrived, Mike Roselle, Ron Huber, and others were arrested for sitting at the base of the tree in support. The first "tree-sitting" lasted less than a day—Jakubal came down in the evening to look over the remains of the forest that had been cut down around him, and was arrested by a hidden Forest Service officer—but the tree-sitting concept was deemed sound by Earth First! members. Huber, Jakubal, and Roselle demonstrated the concept at the June 14 Washington EF Rendezvous; on June 23, a convoy of activists arrived at Willamette National Forest and set up tree platforms in "Squaw/Three timbersale", a location the group thought was threatened with imminent destruction. While at one point, up to a dozen trees were occupied, on July 10 a clash took down all the trees with platforms except for Ron Huber's after the other sitters had left for an overnight meeting elsewhere. Huber remained at his tree, dubbed Yggdrasil, until July 20 when two Linn County sheriff's deputies were lifted in a crane box and wrestled him from the tree.

Direct action 
After 1987, Earth First! became primarily associated with direct action to prevent logging, building of dams, and other forms of development which may cause destruction of wildlife habitats or the despoliation of wild places. The change in direction attracted many new members to Earth First!, some of whom came from a leftist or anarchist political background or were involved in the counterculture.  Dave Foreman has suggested that this led to the introduction of activities such as a "puke-in" at a shopping mall, a flag burning, the heckling of Edward Abbey at the 1987 Earth First! rendezvous, and back-and-forth debates in the Earth First! Journal on topics such as anarchism, with which Foreman and other Earth First! members did not wish to be associated.  Most of the group's older members, including Dave Foreman, Howie Wolke, Bart Koehler, Christopher Manes, George Wuerthner, and Earth First! Journal editor John Davis, became increasingly uncomfortable with this new direction. This tension reportedly led several of the founders to sever their ties to Earth First! in 1990.  Many of them went on to launch the magazine, Wild Earth, as well as the environmental group, the Wildlands Project. On the other hand, Roselle, along with activists such as Judi Bari, welcomed the new direct-action tactics and leftist direction of Earth First!.

Starting in the mid-1980s, Earth First! increasingly promoted and identified with "deep ecology", a philosophy put forth by Arne Næss, Bill Devall, and George Sessions, which holds that all forms of life on Earth have equal value in and of themselves, without regard for their utility to human beings.

Earth First!, from 1990–present 

Since 1990, action within the Earth First! movement has become increasingly influenced by anarchist political philosophy. This change brought a rotation of the primary media organ in differing regions,, an aversion to organized leadership or administrative structure, and a new trend of identifying Earth First! as a mainstream movement rather than an organization. In 1992, Earth First!'s push toward the mainstream movement led to the creation of an offshoot group called Earth Liberation Front. The Earth Liberation Front was formally introduced during the 1992 Earth First! Round River Rendezvous, where young activists debated the effectiveness of civil disobedience activism tactics in light of the ever-increasing destruction of the planet by human activity. Elders of the Earth First! movement gave their blessing to this newly formed strike team known as ELF. ELF became the extremists of the environmental movement, just as the Earth First! movement itself had been when it was created a decade earlier.

Earth First! protests commonly involved occupations of forested timber sale areas and other threatened natural areas. In these protests, dozens of people physically locked their bodies to trees, bulldozers, and desks using specially created lock boxes (metal tubes reinforced with rebar) through which protesters threaded their arms, or using bicycle U-locks in order to lock their necks to other objects.

HeadWaters 
The HeadWaters campaign in Northern California aims to protect the last old-growth redwood forests, Headwaters Grove (now known as Headwaters Forest Reserve) 3,000-acres of forest from logging by the Pacific Lumber Company. Charles Hurwitz and his company Maxxam, Inc. purchased Pacific Lumber Company in 1985, and planned to liquidate its assets including these old-growth forests.

In 1997, as part of the ongoing HeadWaters Redwoods protests, activists locked themselves to a redwood stump which was carried into California Congressman Frank Riggs' office in Eureka. HeadWaters was an ongoing protest lasting over a decade, and ending in 2009.

The 1990s lawsuit, Headwaters Forest Defense vs. Humboldt County, charged that police officers were using excessive force, including chemical weapons.

The first acknowledged death of an Earth First! activist occurred on September 18, 1998, in Northern California's Redwood forests. Earth First! activist David Nathan "Gypsy" Chain attempted to protect the forest by moving around inside the active logging site, thereby creating unsafe conditions for timber harvest. Normally, this would have resulted in the interruption of logging, but a large Redwood, thought to be over 300 years old, was cut down by a Pacific Lumber logger and fell upon Chain, who died instantly.

Cove-Mallard Timber 
Between 1992 and 1998 took place the largest timber sale in United States Forest Service history, the Cove-Mallard timber sale of 6,000 acres in Idaho near the Nez Perce National Forest. The group of EarthFirst activists focused on this area were called the "Cove-Mallard Coalition".

With the aid of a nearby landowner, a former land developer turned activist, Earth First! occupied the forest. As a result, Earth First! succeeded in saving most of the threatened wilderness area. Over 350 people from 12 countries were arrested and the project was reduced from its initial plan of 200 clear-cuts and the construction of seven new roads, to 37 clear-cuts and two new roads.
In June 1993, Earth First! halted the construction of the Noble Road by erecting elaborate multi-layered barricades, which included U.S. Forest Service vehicles. These barricades were constructed in one night, during which activists traveled 17 miles through the mountains dodging law enforcement patrols who had been informed of the planned demonstration. The first tripod lockdowns occurred at this incident, which involved three 30 foot logs, tied together and placed upright, with an activist tied to a platform between them 20 feet in the air. The tripod was placed over trenches in which four activists were buried in quick-drying cement. Two additional activists used U-locks to lock their necks to the front axles of responding vehicles. U.S. Forest Service shot at activists and raided the land with a SWAT team armed with M-16s. 27 activists were arrested.

William "Avalon" Rodgers, a member of the Earth Liberation Front, who alongside the rest of his ELF group was also arrested and were serving life sentences in federal prison for crimes that involved property damage. Rodgers was a long term Earth First activist, and one of the occupation activists of Free Cascadia/Warner Creek Oregon and the Cove/Mallard Idaho protests for years and one of four who constantly camped out in snow-caves monitoring the only logging of Noble Road in the winter of January to March 1995 in 12-foot deep snow and sub-zero temps.

Free Cascadia 
During Free Cascadia, a mass occupation organized by Earth First! at the Warner Creek timber sale in Oregon, 50-plus activists continuously occupied the burnt forested mountains of Oregon for a year in 1994-1995. They endured bad weather and law enforcement raids. Their barricades which were dug in reinforced trenches, forts with watchtowers, and tree-sits enabled a constant occupation of the land while lawsuits and political actions locally and in Washington D.C., ultimately saved the land.  Warner Creek is often seen an example of how the Earth First movement was successful, though most Earth First occupations of timber sales, failed.

In the summer of 1995, environmental activists attempted to occupy the old-growth timber sale area of Sugarloaf Mountain in Southern Oregon. The Sugarloaf Mountain had been in legal battles for over a decade when the "Rider from Hell" was added in committee to the congressional Crime Bill of 1994, which mandated the logging of thousands of acres of old-growth forest. The United States Forest Service declared an exclusionary zone of 30 square miles in southern Oregon and arrested anyone in the area, including a local woman walking her dog. Over 100 federal agents, supported by helicopters and the elite US Army Ranger-trained law enforcement squad known as "Camo-Feddies," arrested hundreds of activists. The environmental activists engaged at all levels of protest with numerous public and illegal demonstrations by Earth First, protests at government offices locally and in Washington D.C., tree-sits in active logging zones, and even an attempted helicopter pad lock-down to immobilize logging helicopters.  One tree from Sugarloaf timber sale, which was a four day long tree-sit by a local father and son Earth First team, required 9 log trucks to carry it out in sections. This tree was estimated to be over 400 years old and took twenty-seven minutes to cut down using a 7-foot chainsaw.

Earth First! responded by immediately occupying the nearby timber sale known as China Left in early October 1995 to defend the old-growth forest and the last wild salmon spawning grounds in Oregon. EF activists used dragon lock-boxes on both ends of the valley's only road to protect the area. A female Earth First! activist known as "Ocean" held the road for a day as police attempted to remove this human-and-cement blockade, allowing Earth First! to dig in farther down the valley. This was the start of two-year-long occupation protest, during which a pickup truck was turned into a lock box to block the only bridge to the valley.

Judi Bari car bombing 
In 1990, a bomb exploded in the car of Earth First! activist Judi Bari, injuring Bari and fellow activist Darryl Cherney. Bari and Cherney were arrested due to suspicions by the police and Federal Bureau of Investigation that they had been transporting a bomb that had accidentally exploded. Bari contended that extremists opposed to her pro-environmental actions had placed the bomb in her car in order to kill her. The case against them was eventually dropped due to lack of evidence.

Bari died of cancer in 1997, but her federal lawsuit against the FBI and Oakland, California police resulted in a 2002 jury verdict awarding her estate and Darryl Cherney a total of $4.4 million. As a result of the civil case, it was determined that eighty percent of the damages were for violation of their First Amendment rights by the FBI and police.

A documentary movie about the court case, entitled The Forest for the Trees, was released in 2006. It was directed by Bernadine Mellis, whose father is one of the lawyers featured in the documentary. The documentary Who Bombed Judi Bari?, directed by Mary Liz Thomson, was released in 2012. The filmmakers are offering a $50,000 reward for information leading the arrest of the bomber.

On March 21, 2011, a U.S. federal judge in California ordered the FBI to preserve evidence related to the car bombing. The FBI was planning to destroy all evidence in the case. The bombing remains unsolved.

Protest and ecodefense 
Most activists of Earth First! have previously participated in more moderate forms of environmental and political activism, including protest marches and writing letters to politicians. 'Fawn", an Earth First!er in the United States, grew up as a Republican, in a middle-class family. Most members of Earth First! identify as decentralized, locally informed activists whose ideas stem from communitarian ethics. One of the early critics of Earth First!'s change in tactics later accused the FBI of deliberately introducing the concept of Non-Violence to the group.

In various parts of the United States, individual citizens and small groups form the base for grassroots political actions. These may take the form of legal actions, including protests, timber sale appeals, and educational campaigns or civil disobedience, including tree sitting, road blockades, and sabotage (also called "ecotage" by some Earth First! members, who claim it is a form of ecodefense). Often, disruptive direct action is used primarily as a stalling tactic in an attempt to prevent possible environmental destruction while Earth First! lawsuits try to secure long-term victories. Reported tactics include road blockades, activists locking themselves to heavy equipment, tree-sitting, and sabotage of machinery.

Earth First! was known for providing information in the Earth First! Journal on the practice of tree-spiking and monkeywrenching (or ecotage), although there is no evidence that Earth First! was involved in related activity. In 1990, Judi Bari convinced Earth First! in the Northern California and Southern Oregon region to renounce the practice of tree-spiking, calling them counterproductive to an effort to form a coalition with workers and small logging businesses to defeat large-scale corporate logging in Northern California.

Police used non-lethal weapons and tactics against Earth First! protesters including pepper spray, pain compliance holds, police dogs, and the threat of guns in attempts to coerce the protesters to abandon their lock downs.

Earth First! United Kingdom 

The Earth First! movement in the United Kingdom started in 1990, when a group in Hastings, Sussex organised an action at Dungeness nuclear power station in Kent. It grew rapidly, and many groups formed, with or without the EF! name, over the next years.

The first major Earth First! action happened in December 1991 at Port of Tilbury and focused around the importation of tropical hardwood. The second major action, the Merseyside Dock Action, attracted between 200–600 people who occupied Liverpool docks for two days.  This action coincided with the Earth First! roadshow, in which a group of UK & US Earth First!ers toured the country. Other early campaigns also focused on timber-yards, most notably the Timbmet yard in Oxford.

There are now various regional Earth First! groups, the EF! Action Update has been joined by the EF! Action Reports website and a yearly Earth First! national gathering. At the first gathering in Sussex the debate focused on the use of criminal damage as a protest technique. Earth First! decided to neither 'condemn nor condone' criminal damage, instead it focused more on non-violent direct action techniques. Some people at the gathering coined the term Earth Liberation Front (ELF), which became a separate movement which spread back to the US. Actions involving criminal damage did happen often under cover of night and were typically done under an ELF banner and attributed to elves and pixies, or the Earth Liberation Faeries, giving a distinctly British feel to the movement.

Major growth in the direct action movement started with a concurrent focus on roads, and a protest camp at Twyford Down was started, against the M3 in Hampshire. Whilst Earth First! groups still played an essential part, other groups such as the Dongas tribe soon formed. Alongside SchNEWS, such publications as the Earth First! Action Update, and Do or Die were means of communication between the groups. The movement grew to other road protest camps including the Newbury bypass, the A30 and the M11 link road protest in London, where whole streets were squatted in order to slow down the construction work.  Later the focus widened to other campaigns including Reclaim the Streets, anti-genetics campaigns, and Rising Tide. More recently, there have been groups such as Peat Alert! and Plane Stupid.

The UK Earth First! groups differed considerably from the U.S. groups as reported in a ten-year retrospective of the Earth First! by two of the founders Jake Bowers and Jason Torrance:

Seeing ecological and social justice as one and the same, in addition to organizing along anarchist lines and bringing in other radical and militant struggles, mixed with audacious actions and real radicalism spread the EF! ideal to other countries and helped morph the US movement.

Sabotage

Fairfield Snowbowl Ski Resort 
Earth First! member Mark Davis was sentenced in Federal court to six years in prison for malicious destruction of property at the Fairfield Snowbowl Ski Resort near Flagstaff, Arizona, in concert with David Foreman, Ilse Asplund, Margaret Millett, and Mark Baker. Davis had been charged with "using a torch to cut around the base of the top pylon of the main chair lift at Snowbowl on October 25, 1988."

The resort attack, sabotage at Energy Fuels' Canyon uranium mine (6 miles southeast of Tusayan, Arizona), and attempting to cut down power-line towers leading to the Central Arizona Project aqueduct, were characterized as dress rehearsals for attacks on nuclear plants.

Telluride Ski Resort 
On August 10, 1991, vandals identifying themselves as members of Earth First! forced the closing of the Telluride Ski Resort in Mountain Village, Colorado using a chemical to write messages on 11 greens, such as "Earth First!", "Hayduke lives" and "Ron you pig". In relation to the incident, the Telluride Times Journal received a letter signed "Earth First" stating that the ski lift had been sabotaged with a welding gas applied to the lift cable that weakens the metal.

Aspen Pipeline Sabotage 
A gas pipeline In Aspen Colorado was sabotaged turning off heat to 3,500 people on December 29, 2020. The perpetrators wrote Earth First! on the pipeline.

Filmography

Documentary films

See also 
 Conservation ethic
 Extinction Rebellion
 Green anarchism
 Green syndicalism
 Hayduke
 List of environmental organizations

References

Further reading

Books about Earth First!, the early years 

 Davis, John, ed. The Earth First! Reader: Ten Years of Radical Environmentalism (1991)
 Foreman, David. Confessions of an Eco-Warrior (1991)
 Foreman, David. Ecodefense: A Field Guide to Monkeywrenching (1985)
 Manes, Christopher. Green Rage: Radical Environmentalism and the Unmaking of Civilization (1990)
 Scarce, Rik. Eco-Warriors: Understanding the Radical Environmental Movement (2006)
 Wall, Derek. Earth First! and the Anti-Roads Movement: Radical Environmentalism and Comparative Social Movements  (1999)
 Zakin, Susan. Coyotes and Town Dogs: Earth First! and the Environmental Movement (1993)
 Lee, Martha. Earth First!: Environmental Apocalypse (1995)

Books about Earth First!, post–1990 
 EF! Publications. Do or Die - Voices from the Ecological Resistance (ISSN 1462-5989)
 Bari, Judi. Timber Wars (1994)
 Scarce, Rik. Eco-Warriors: Understanding the Radical Environmental Movement (2006)
 Wall, Derek Earth First and the Anti-Roads Movement (1999)
 Chadwick, Paul "Concrete: Think Like A Mountain"
 King, Elli (Editor) LISTEN: The Story of the People at Taku Wakan Tipi and the Reroute of Highway 55 or The Minnehaha Free State(2006)

Books critical of Earth First! 
 Arnold, Ron. Ecoterror: The Violent Agenda to Save Nature (1997)
 Bradford, George. How Deep is Deep Ecology? (1989)
 Clausen, Barry. Walking on the Edge: How I Infiltrated Earth First! (1994)
 Coleman, Kate. The Secret Wars of Judi Bari (2005)

External links 
 The History and Impact of Earth First!
  
 Earth First! Journal
 Earth First! Newswire
 Introducing Earth First!
 documentary films on IMDb
 Earth First! UK

Environmental organizations based in the United States
Radical environmentalism
Anti-road protest
Green anarchism
Direct action
Environmental organizations established in 1980
1980 establishments in the United States
Anti-consumerist groups